Many place names in Palestine were Arabized forms of ancient Hebrew and Canaanite place-names used in biblical times or later Aramaic formations. Most of these names have been handed down for thousands of years though their meaning was understood by only a few. The cultural interchange fostered by the various successive empires to have ruled the region is apparent in its place names. Any particular place can be known by the different names used in the past, with each of these corresponding to a historical period. For example, the city of Beit Shean, today in Israel, was known during the Israelite period as Beth-shean, under Hellenistic rule and Roman rule as Scythopolis, and under Arab and Islamic rule as Beisan.

The importance of toponymy, or geographical naming, was first recognized by the Palestine Exploration Fund (PEF), a British organization who mounted geographical map-making expeditions in the region in the late 19th century. Shortly thereafter, the British Mandatory authorities set out to gather toponymic information from local fellahin, who had been proven to have preserved knowledge of the ancient place names which could help identify archaeological sites.  

Since the establishment of the State of Israel, many place names have since been Hebraicized, and are referred to by their revived biblical names. In some cases, even sites with only Arabic names and no pre-existing ancient Hebrew names or associations have been given new Hebrew names. Place names in the region have been the subject of much scholarship and contention, particularly in the context of the Arab–Israeli conflict. Their significance lies in their potential to legitimize the historical claims asserted by the involved parties, all of whom claim priority in chronology, and who use archaeology, cartography, and place names as their proofs.

History
The local population of Palestine used Semitic languages, such as Hebrew, Jewish Palestinian Aramaic, Christian Palestinian Aramaic, Samaritan Aramaic and Arabic for thousands of years. Almost all place names in the region have Semitic roots, with only a few place names being of Latin origin, and hardly any of Greek or Turkish origins. The Semitic roots of the oldest names continued to be used by the indigenous population, though during classical antiquity, many names underwent modifications due to the influence of local ruling elites well versed in Greek and Latin.

In his 4th-century work, the Onomasticon, Eusebius of Caesarea provides a listing of the place-names of Palestine with geographical and historical commentary, and his text was later translated into Latin and edited and corrected by Jerome.

Following the Arab conquest of the Levant, many of the pre-classical Semitic names were revived, though often the spelling and pronunciation differed. Of course, for places where the old name had been lost or for new settlements established during this period, new Arabic names were coined. Though often visited by European travelers in the centuries to follow, many of whom composed travel accounts describing its topography and demography, towards the end of Ottoman imperial rule, there was still much confusion over the place names in Palestine. Existing Turkish transliterations of the Arabic and Arabicized names made identification and study into the etymology of the place names even more challenging.

Edward Robinson identified more than 100 biblical place names in Palestine, by pursuing his belief that linguistic analysis of the place names used by the Arab fellahin would reveal preserved traces of their ancient roots. The PEF's Names and Places in the Old and New Testaments and the Apocrypha, with their Modern Identifications (1895) lists more than 1,150 place names related to the Old Testament and 162 related to the New, most of which are located in Palestine. These surveys by Robinson the PEF, and other Western biblical geographers in late 19th and early 20th centuries, also eventually contributed to the shape of the borders delineated for the British Mandate in Palestine, as proposed by the League of Nations.

With the establishment of Israel, in parts of Palestine, many place names have since been Hebraized or are referred to by their revived Biblical names. In some cases, even sites with only Arabic names and no pre-existing ancient Hebrew names or associations have been given new Hebrew names.

The preservation of place names "with amazing consistency" is noted by Yohanan Aharoni in The Land of the Bible (1979). He attributes this continuity to the common Semitic background of Palestine's local inhabitants throughout the ages, and the fact that place names tended to reflect extant agricultural features at the site in question.  According to Uzi Leibner, this preservation of names is "a function of continuity of settlement at the site itself, or at least in the immediate region", and most of the sites in question were inhabited during the Byzantine and Middle Islamic periods.

Linguistic roots

Water sources
Agricultural features are common to roots of place names in Palestine. For example, some place names incorporate the Semitic root for "spring" or "cistern", such as Beersheba or Bir as 'Saba, ("be'er" and "bir" meaning "well" in Hebrew and Arabic respectively) and En Gedi or 'Ayn Jeddi ("en" and "'ayn" meaning "spring" in Hebrew and Arabic respectively).

Hebrew terms that are used in the Hebrew Bible survived into later usage by the fellahin. Examples include the Hebrew words Nahar - occurs unchanged as Nahr; Nahal survives  in villages located near large torrents, such as Nahalin; Bitzah that appears as Bussah, Geb that occurs several times as Jub, and Bor that appears as Bur, and in dual, Burin.

Features 
Some place names are derived from Hebrew or Aramaic names for local features, as in for 'fort' (as in At-Tira, Al-Tira and others) or 'castle'. Some of these place names were later confounded with the Arabic for tair (bird) or bir (well).

The biblical term for hamlet, Caphar appears unchanged as Kefr.

Deities
Other place names preserve the names of Semitic gods and goddesses from ancient times. For example, the name of the goddess Anat survives in the name of the village of 'Anata, believed to be site of the ancient city of Anathoth.

Direct translations 
In some cases the original name was simply translated, such as the ancient city of Dan ("judge") which turned into the Arabic Tell el-Qadi, "mound of the judge". However, the original name of the city was preserved in the nearby source of the Jordan river, which had the name "Dhan".

Exceptions 
Yehuda Elitzor observes that in the majority of cases, Arab-speaking conquerors, rulers, or settlers did not give new names to places where their original names were known and existing; an exception is the city of Hebron, for which its historic name was replaced by the Arabic name "Khalil al-Rahman"; he suggests that the new name was lifted from a tradition prevalent among the Jews of Hebron.

Linguistic conversion 

The Hebrew letter Ḥet (ח) is correctly Ḥāʾ (ح) in Arabic, though frequently also Ḫāʾ(خ), and sometimes 'Ayn (ع) takes its place (as happened in Beth Horon > Beit 'Ur). Guerin noted that in his time, Beit Hanina was sometimes referred to as Bayt 'Anina. The Talmud refers to this mistake of [ħ] and [ʕ] as Galilean vulgarism. The Samaritans confused ח and ק.

Another similar case is the shift from [[Ayin|Ayin]] ([ʕ], Hebrew: ע, Arabic: ع) into Aleph ([ʔ], Hebrew: א, Arabic: ا), even though both sounds exist in Arabic. For instance, the Biblical name Endor (עין דור, using [ʕ]) was changed to Indur (إندور, using [ʔ]). The Jews of Galilee (specifically in Haifa, Beth-shean and Tiv'on) were already "producing Ayins as Alephs," according to rabbinic literature, which already makes notice of this shift.

The Hebrew suffix -el tends to change to -in in Arabic, as in Bethel > Beitin, Yizre'el (Jezreel) > Zir'in.

The Hebrew suffix t (ת) tends to drop from Hebrew to Arabic, as in Ḥammat > al-Ḥamme (for Hamma), ‛Aqrabat > ‛Aqraba (for Aqraba), and Nāṣrat > en-Nāṣre (for Nazareth).

 Identification methods 

 Conversations with fellahin 
The vast majority of place-name identifications are made upon their similarity to existing Palestinian Arabic place names, or else upon the assessment of other geographical information provided by the Biblical texts.

Many of the local names were learned by the explorers by asking the local fellahin.

Clermont-Ganneau noted that the fellahin women were more ancient in their habits, attire, and language and frequently had greater knowledge of names than the fellahin men, which occasionally prompted the men to respond violently.

Occasionally, the same geographic feature could go by several names among the locals. The valley next to Khirbet 'Adaseh, north of Jerusalem, was referred to as Wady ed-Dumm, "Valley of Blood" by the people of Beit Hanina (which some have claimed got its name from being the location of the battle of Adasa), and Wady 'Adaseh by the people of Bir Nabala.

 Archeological findings 
James B. Pritchard wrote in 1959 that of the thousands of ancient places throughout Palestine known by name from the Hebrew Bible and historical sources, only four had then been identified based on inscriptions found during archaeological excavations at the respective locations: Gezer (boundary stones near Tell el-Jazari), Beit She'an (an Egyptian stela of Seti I found at Beisan), Lachish (the Lachish lettersfound at Tell ed-Duweir) and Gibeon (the Al Jib jar handles). Hershel Shanks wrote in 1983 that Gezer was the first of these, and that Tel Arad and Tel Hazor have also been identified in this manner. In 1996, the location of Ekron was supported with the discovery of the Ekron Royal Dedicatory Inscription.

Evolution of names, a selection
 'Aīd el Mâ (`Eîd el Mieh): Recognized by modern archaeologists, historical geographers and cartographers as the biblical site of Adullam, mentioned in 1 Samuel 22:2.
 Battir: During the Bar Kokhba revolt, this site was known as Betar. Its Arabic name Battir is evidently related to the ancient name. The village was also identified by an ancient mound in the vicinity called Khirbet el-Yahud ("ruin of the Jews").
 Beit Guvrin: a modern kibbutz in the Lakhish region, which was built near the site of Bayt Jibrin, an Arab village depopulated during the 1948 Arab–Israeli war. This village was originally known by the Aramaic name Beth Gabra ("house of the strong men"). The Romans gave it the Greek name of Eleutheropolis ("city of the free") but it is nonetheless listed in the Tabula Peutingeriana of 393 CE as Beitogabri.". In the Talmud, its name is transcribed as Beit Gubrin (or Guvrin). The Crusaders referred to it as Bethgibelin or simply Gibelin. Its Arabic name Beit Jibrin ("house of the powerful") is derived from the original Aramaic name.
 Beit Ur al-Fauqa ("Upper house of straw") and Beit Ur al-Tahta ("Lower house of straw") preserve parts of the original Canaanite names for these sites: Bethoron Elyon ("Upper Bethoron"), and Bethoron Tahton ("Lower Bethoron"). Bethoron means the "House of Horon", named for the Egypto-Canaanite deity Horon mentioned in Ugaritic literature and other texts.
 Dayr Aban: Literally, "Monastery of Aban," thought by historical geographers to be the biblical Abenezer, mentioned in 1 Samuel 4:1, and located 2 miles east of `Ain Shems (Beit Shemesh).
 El-Azariyeh: The town of Bethany, so-called because of its most notable citizen, Lazarus.
 Indur: Depopulated during the 1948 Arab–Israeli war, this village preserves the name of the ancient Canaanite city of Endor. Though the precise location of the ancient site remains a source of debate, the preferred candidate lies 1 kilometer northeast of Indur, a site known as Khirbet Safsafa.
 Jenin: Jenin is identified with the biblical towns of Ein Ganim and Beth-Haggan. Its name was changed to Ginat or Ginae. The Arabicized name Jenin derived from the original.
 Jericho: Known among the local inhabitants as Ariha (Ar-riha, meaning "fragrance"), it is described in the 10th century Book of Josippon, as "Jericho: City of Fragrance" (ir hareah). It is thought that the current name is derived from the Canaanite name Yareah, meaning "moon".
 Jib: Jib preserves the name of its ancient predecessor, Gibeon.
 Kafr 'Ana: The Arabicized form of the name Ono, a Canaanite town mentioned in 1 Chronicles 8:12.
 Hebron: The ancient town of Hebron is known in Arabic as "al-Khalil", so-called after Abraham the Patriarch who was called the "friend" (Ar. "khalil") of God.
 Lifta: Recognized by modern archaeologists and historical geographers as the biblical site of Nephtoah, mentioned in the Book of Joshua (15:9; 18:15).
 Nablus: Originally named Flavia Neapolis since it was founded in 72 CE by the Romans; in 636 CE, it was conquered by the Arabs, who Arabicized its name to Nablus.
 Qal'at Ras el-'Ain: Literally, "the Castle of the Fountain-head," or what was formerly called Antipatris (a site near Rosh HaAyin), at the source of the Yarkon River, also known as Nahr Abū Fuṭrus (a corruption of Antipatris).
 Qamun: A tell near Mount Carmel. Qamun's original name was the Israelite Yokneam, from which the Arabic Qamun (meaning "cumin") was derived. Before Israelite times the Canaanite city was probably called En-qn'mu as it appears in Egyptian sources. The Romans called it Cammona and Cimona, while the Crusaders called it Caymont and also Cains Mon ("Cain's Mountain") reflecting a popular local tradition that Cain was slain nearby.
 Jebel Quruntul: Originally a Semitic name (possibly Dagon) preserved in the Hellenistic fortress name Dok, renamed Quarantana & related names in Latin to reflect the belief that StHelena had identified a cave there as the place Jesus fasted for 40 days, preserved as Arabic Quruntul and Hebrew Qarantal.
 Ramallah: Founded in the mid-16th century, its original name was Arabic, as it is today.
 Seilun, Kh.: A Middle and Late Bronze Age Canaanite city, called Shiloh in the canonical books of the Hebrew Bible (Joshua, Judges, 1 Samuel, and Psalms). The tell comprising the ruins of the ancient town is known is Modern Hebrew as Tel Shiloh.
 Tulkarm: Founded in the 3rd century CE as Berat Soreqa, its name in Aramaic was Tur Karma, meaning "mount of the vineyards". This name was then Arabicized to Tul Karem.
 Tuqu: The Arabicized form of the name Tekoa, mentioned in 2 Chronicles 20:20, and Amos 1:1. 
 Yahudiya (known as Al-'Abbasiyya since 1932) means "the Jewish (city)" and is thought to be related to the biblical town of Yahud, mentioned in the Book of Joshua.
 Yalo: Destroyed during the 1967 war, this village was originally known by the Canaanite name Aijalon. The Arabic name Yalu, by which it was known for centuries, is derived from the Canaanite original.
 Yazur: Depopulated prior to the 1948 war, the village's name in the 8th and 7th centuries BCE is recorded in Assyrian texts as Azuru.
 Yodfat: A Galilean town destroyed in the First Jewish-Roman War, when it was known as Jotapata (Yodfat). Before the establishment of Israel, its site was known as Shifat, Kh.

Use of place names as personal names
Since the exodus of 1948, Arab Palestinians have begun a tradition of naming their daughters after destroyed Arab villages.

See also
 Names of Jerusalem
 List of modern names for biblical place names
 Language shift
 Timeline of the name Palestine

References

Bibliography

 
 
 
 
 
 
 
 
 
 
 
 
 

 
 
 
 
 
 
 
 
 
 
 
 

History of Palestine (region)
Palestine, Place names of
Arabization
Historical geography